Upper Smoky Dome Lake 1 is an alpine lake in Camas County, Idaho, United States, located in the Soldier Mountains in the Sawtooth National Forest.  No trails lead to the lake, and it is in the Smoky Dome Lakes basin northeast of Smoky Dome, which is the highest peak in the Soldier Mountains.

References

See also
 Sawtooth National Forest
 Soldier Mountains

Lakes of Idaho
Lakes of Camas County, Idaho
Glacial lakes of the United States
Glacial lakes of the Sawtooth National Forest